Golden Hotel may refer to:

in Lesotho;
Golden Hotel (Mafeking, Lesotho)

in the United States
Golden Hotel (O'Neill, Nebraska), a hotel listed on the U.S. National Register of Historic Places